This list of Hudson Bay rivers includes the principal rivers draining into the Hudson, James and Ungava bays of the Arctic Ocean. The Hudson Bay drainage basin includes parts of five Canadian provinces (Alberta, Saskatchewan, Manitoba, Ontario, and Quebec), two territories (Northwest Territories and Nunavut), and four US states (Montana, South Dakota, North Dakota, and Minnesota).

The rivers are presented by coastline, clockwise, starting with the George River in north-eastern Quebec, just south of Cape Chidley and the entrance to the Atlantic Ocean.

Rivers in Quebec
George River
Tunulic
À la Baleine
False
Koksoak
Aux Feuilles
Arnaud
Kovik River
Povungnituk River
Kogaluc
Innuksuac
Qikirtaluup Kuunga
Nastapoka
Chenal Goulet
Petite Rivière de la Baleine
Grande Rivière de la Baleine
Roggan River
La Grande
Eastmain
Pontax
Rupert
Broadback
Nottaway
Harricana

Rivers in Ontario
Moose
Albany
Lawashi
Attawapiskat
Ekwan
Winisk
Severn

Rivers in Manitoba

Hayes
Nelson
Churchill
North & South Knife
Red River of the North
Seal
Caribou

Rivers in Nunavut

Geillini
Thlewiaza
Tha-anne
Ferguson
Wilson
Chesterfield Inlet
Lorillard
Brown
Kirchoffer (Southampton Island)
Koukdjuak River (Baffin Island)

Rivers in Alberta

North Saskatchewan
Battle
Beaver
South Saskatchewan
Bow
Elbow
Highwood
Oldman
St. Mary
Red Deer

Rivers in the United States

Bois de Sioux River
Buffalo River (Minnesota)
Marsh River (Minnesota)
Red River of the North
Sand Hill River
Souris River
Turtle River (North Dakota)

See also
James Bay Project
Nelson River Hydroelectric Project
Rupert's Land

References

Stephen J. Déry et al., Characteristics and Trends of River Discharge into Hudson, James and Ungava Bays, 1964-2000, Journal of Climate, 18 (2005), pages 2540-2557.
Water Resources of Canada (Website of Environment Canada)

Lists of rivers
Lists of rivers of Canada
Lists of rivers of the United States
Hudson Bay drainage basin